Henry Clarke born in 1989, is an American racing driver from Villa Park, California.

Clarke began racing in the USAC National Sprint Car Series in 2008 and won Rookie of the Year honors in 2009, finishing 12th in overall points. On July 2, 2010 he captured his first National Sprint Car win at Toledo Speedway. On September 24, 2010 he completed a Firestone Indy Lights rookie test for Davey Hamilton Racing at Kentucky Speedway. He signed on with the team to make his series debut at Homestead-Miami Speedway and finished 11th while his teammate Brandon Wagner captured his first series victory.

References

External links
Henry Clarke official website

Indy Lights drivers
Living people
Sportspeople from Orange County, California
Racing drivers from California
1989 births